M2 is one of the five lines of metro of the Bucharest Metro. The M2 Line runs from Pipera to Berceni, thus linking the north to the south of the city. The line is the busiest on the system, passing through a multitude of neighbourhoods, and also the only line to serve the centre of the city.

History 
The line was built during the 1980s when the industrial development in Romania was in full swing. A north-south metro line was crucial, seeing as other methods of public transport were very crowded and cars were very rare. As such the construction of this line was prioritised over others such as the M4, which was only completed recently. The building of the M2 line led to the removal in 1987 of the trolleybus lines linking Berceni to Băneasa; those lines, put in place in 1962, were made obsolete by the opening of the metro, according to the city planners at the time.

The M2 line was opened in two steps:
Berceni – Piața Unirii on 24 January 1986;
Piata Unirii – Pipera on 25 October 1987.
A unique station on the Bucharest Metro is Piața Romană, which was shelved from the initial plan. It was built after the opening of the line in 1987, and this can be noticed easily; the platforms are very narrow and the pillars are massive. The station opened on 28 November 1988.

As it stands now, the line is currently overcapacity due to the massive amount of commuters using the line, and also the gap left due to the removal of trolleybus lines. Aside from this, the line infrastructure has reached its maximum age usage, and is prone to various incidents. Metrorex announced on 30 May 2019 that the line will undergo renovations over a 48-month period, although a beginning date on the works has yet to be announced.

Rolling Stock 

The M2 uses new, CAF trains. The CAF trains were bought in 2014 so that the Movia trains could run on the M1 and M3, replacing the old Astra IVA trains that were moved to the new line of M4.

Name Changes

Extensions 
The name of the new station will be Tudor Arghezi (after the writer Tudor Arghezi). The project includes also a park and ride facility with 600 places and it's expected to be completed in two years.

References 

Bucharest Metro Lines
Railway lines opened in 1986